Brenda J. Council (born 1953 or 1954) is a politician and a disbarred labor lawyer from North Omaha, Nebraska. She represented the 11th District in the Nebraska State Legislature from 2009 to 2013, succeeding longtime state senator Ernie Chambers, who was term-limited. She lost her 2012 reelection bid to Chambers, who was able to run for the seat again after sitting out one term. The same year, she pleaded guilty to misuse of campaign funds, for which she was disbarred in 2014.

Political career

Council has served on the Omaha School Board and the Omaha City Council, and ran for mayor in 1994 and 1997, losing both elections by slim margins. She was formerly western regional president of the National Caucus of Black School Board Members. She was featured three times in Ebony Magazine due to her prominence as an Omaha leader, and was a permanent roundtable member of the Omaha KETV television Sunday morning talk show, Kaleidoscope.

In February 2008, Council filed to run for the seat in the Nebraska State Legislature being vacated by Senator Ernie Chambers, who had been a state senator for 38 years but was barred from seeking reelection due to a new term limits law. In November 2008, she was elected to the Nebraska Legislature. Council ran for reelection in 2012 but lost to Chambers, who was able to run for the legislature again after sitting out one four-year term.

Personal life
Council was born in Omaha, attended Omaha Central High School and the University of Nebraska-Lincoln (class of 1974). She received a J.D. degree from Creighton University School of Law in 1977. She is married to Otha Kenneth Council.

Awards

Council received numerous awards and honors including the Urban League of Nebraska's National Prominence Award, selection as the Nebraska Outstanding Young Woman, the University of Nebraska-Lincoln Teachers College Alumni Award of Excellence, the African American award of the Durham Western Heritage Museum and installation as the 62nd Face on the Floor of the Omaha Press Club.

Campaign fund violations
On September 12, 2012, Council pleaded guilty to two misdemeanor charges that she misused campaign cash at casinos and filed false reports concealing that. She withdrew $63,000 at casinos over several years and deposited $36,000 in cash. In December 2013 she was sentenced to probation and fined $500 for felony wire fraud.

Council was subsequently charged in federal court with wire fraud and pleaded guilty, receiving three years' probation along with fines and assessments of $600. On September 12, 2014, the Nebraska Supreme Court disbarred Council for misusing campaign funds. A referee had recommended a one-year suspension followed by two years of probation, but the Court held that harsher discipline was called for. The court noted that since the 1990s, it had disbarred all but two attorneys in cases of conversion and found that those two cases were distinguishable from Council's case. In both of those cases, the attorney had self-reported the misconduct, a factor not present in Council's case. The court held that the conversion of campaign funds is as serious as converting client funds and warranted disbarment.

References

Politicians from Omaha, Nebraska
Creighton University School of Law alumni
African-American state legislators in Nebraska
African-American women in politics
Omaha City Council members
Women state legislators in Nebraska
Nebraska lawyers
Democratic Party Nebraska state senators
Living people
African-American life in Omaha, Nebraska
American gamblers
Disbarred American lawyers
School board members in Nebraska
Women city councillors in Nebraska
Year of birth missing (living people)
Nebraska politicians convicted of crimes
Omaha Central High School alumni
21st-century African-American people
21st-century African-American women